Tourism in Mongolia was extremely limited by the Socialist Government, but has been expanding following the 1990 Democratic Revolution in Mongolia in the wake of the collapse of the USSR and the Revolutions of 1989. Mongolia is a unique and relatively unexplored travel destination that offers a great combination of scenic natural features, a wide variety of untouched landscapes, nomadic life style and culture. Travel organizations in Mongolia date back to half a century ago, but the private sector-based tourism is barely twenty years old. Now Mongolia boasts 403 travel companies, 320 hotels, 647 resorts and tourist camps, all employing the graduates from over 56 educational establishments. Mongolia takes an active part in United Nations World Tourism Organization, of which it is a member party.

To boost foreign investment in tourism, the Government of Mongolia offers special tax exemption equaling up to 10 percent of the total investment if offered for construction of high-rated hotels and tourist complexes. Licenses for tourism business were abolished and service provided by tour operators for expatriate visitors is now exempt from VAT. Standards and regulations are largely non-restrictive, with no complicated layers of bureaucracy issuing permission and exercising control.

A vivid example of the successful reform of the legal framework is the progressive increase of the number of visitors – the number reaching 450,000 in 2010 - tripling the 2000 estimate.
With one of the world's lowest population densities, the vastness of the Mongolian-Manchurian grassland, desert, as well as the numerous mountains, rivers and lakes offer plenty of adventure. Although backpacking is becoming more common, travel outside Ulanbataar is mostly arranged by tour operator companies.

In January 2013, the Ministry of Culture, Sport and Tourism of Mongolia approved official slogan for Mongolia's tourism called “Go Nomadic, Experience Mongolia”  which, it believes, will properly position help boost tourism industry in Mongolia. However, after a year the Ministry replaced the official slogan to new "Mongolia - Nomadic by Nature.

On March 5, 2014, during ITB Berlin 2014 exhibition in Germany, officials from the Ministry of Culture, Sports and Tourism of Mongolia signed an agreement to become official partner country for ITB Berlin 2015.

The Ministry of Culture, Sport and Tourism of Mongolia has been restructured into the Ministry of Environment, Green Development and Tourism in December, 2014 as a result of country's government cabinet change.

Activity travels available include trekking, climbing, bird watching, horse riding, rafting, camel riding, yak caravan and overland motorcycle tours. Many of these tours focus strongly on ecology and wildlife, and almost all of them include the Gobi Desert as one of their destinations; apart from its numerous native animal species, the desert is famous for its fossilised dinosaur bones and eggs. Mongolia's lakes represent another good hiking destination, as do the Four Holy Peaks surrounding Ulaanbaatar or the Gobi Gurvansaikhan National Park, in the Umnugobi.
The economy of Mongolia is expecting "unstoppable" growth as its natural resources are tapped, which will enable further investment in infrastructure.

Statistics
Most visitors arriving to Mongolia on short term basis for tourism were from the following countries of nationality:

Events
The main festival is world-famous Naadam, which has been organized for centuries and is held on July 11 to July 13 in honor of the Democratic Revolution. Naadam consists of three Mongolian traditional sports: archery, long-distance horse-racing, and Mongolian wrestling.
In 2013, The Ministry of Culture, Sport and Tourism of Mongolia published Mongolia Tourism Calendar of Events 2013, in which the Ministry collected all public events related to Mongolian tourism and culture. Many events included in the calendar, which is also available for download online, are repeat events.

Other events include:
Miss Mongolia - beauty pageant to select the country's Miss World, candidate
Eagle festival - in Bayan-Ölgii, hunters use trained eagles to catch small prey, plus Kazakh horse games
Nowruz - in Ölgii, Kazakh New Years parade, concert, and feast
Tsagaan Sar - Lunar New Year festival held throughout Mongolia
Camel Festival - Mongolian winter tourism festival held in Umnugobi province.  The Thousand Camel Festival in the Gobi desert introduces the tradition of camel breeding and herding. It is in Bulgan county, Umnugovi province.   A local non-governmental organization aims to protect and preserve the Bactrian camel population.  And they organize “The Thousand Camel Festival” in Bulgan county, South Gobi province, Mongolia.  Also, the festival aims to celebrate and promote the cultural heritage of Bactrian camels and winter tourism growth in Mongolia.

The festival includes two types of camel races, Camel-Polo, and some other competitions related to camel breeders’ cultural heritage, such as training of untamed camels, making ropes from camel wool, and loading.  And there is a folk concert by school children from the county.

The festival is held annually March 6–7 for two days at Bulgan county, South Gobi province, Mongolia. The festival is one of the heart touching events because of the camel training and other activities related to the camel breeding tradition. 
Ice festival - Winter tourism event held at scenic Khuvsgul lake
Goyol Fashion Festival

Hotels, Resorts and Travel Companies
Hotels in Ulaanbaatar
Gobi Caravanserai
Shangri-La Ulaanbaatar
Hotel Mongolia
Sky Resort
Ramada Ulaanbaatar City Center
Holiday Inn Ulaanbaatar
Chinggis Khaan Hotel
Tuushin Hotel
Kempinski Hotel Khan Palace
Ulaanbaatar Hotel
Bayangol Hotel
Puma - Imperial Hotel
Best western Gobi's Kelso
Corporate Hotel
Travel Agencies in Ulaanbaatar
Zendmen Travel Mongolia
Mongolia Samar Magic Tours, since 1997
Discover Mongolia Travel
Mongolian Ways
Mongolei Reise
Nomadic Adventure LLC
Amicus Travel Mongolia
Khongoryn Els travel company, Mongolia
Gazarchin Travel
Panoramic Journeys
Mongolia Short Tours
Travel to Mongolia
Amicus Mongolei Reisen
DiscoverAltai

Transportation

Buyant-Ukhaa International Airport in Ulaanbaatar is the major international airport in the country, offering scheduled flights to and from Russia, China, South Korea, Singapore, Japan, Germany and Turkey.
MIAT Mongolian Airlines is the national flag air carrier and serves only international destinations such as Moscow, Frankfurt, Berlin, Paris, Beijing, Hong Kong, Seoul, Busan, Singapore, Tokyo, Osaka (operated during summer time) and chartered flights.
Hunnu Air (former Mongolian Airlines Group), founded in 2011, flies both domestically and internationally (Shanghai - (temporary discontinued as of October 2013) and Manzhouli).
Domestic destinations within Mongolia are also served by Aero Mongolia and EZNis Airways (halted its operation ), which offers two short-haul international flights: to cities of Irkutsk and Ulan-Ude of Russia and to Hohhot, Erenhot and Hailaar of China.
The Trans-Mongolian Line of the classic and well known Trans-Siberian Railway connects Mongolia's capital Ulaanbaatar with Moscow and Vladivostok in Russia as well as Beijing, China. 

 The Trans-Mongolian Railway runs from China to Russia and connects Ulan-Ude, which is on the Trans–Baikal (Trans–Siberian) railway in Russia, with Jining in China. Some other notable stops are Sükhbaatar, Darkhan, Choir, and Zamyn-Üüd / Erenhot. Additionally, there are important branches leading to both Erdenet and Baganuur.

See also
Best time to visit Mongolia
National Museum of Mongolian History
Visa policy of Mongolia
Mongolia Entry Requirements during the Covid-19
Mongolian cuisine
Geography of Mongolia
Climate of Mongolia
Trans-Siberian Railway
List of museums in Mongolia
List of accommodations in Mongolia
List of best attractions in Mongolia

References

External links

Discover Mongolia Travel
Mongolian Ways
Bigges Tourism Information Website of Mongolia
Official Tourism Website of Mongolia
Official Tourism Website of Bayan-Ölgii, Mongolia
Official Tourism Website of Amicus Travel, Mongolia
Official Tourism Website of Samar Magic Tours, Mongolia
Official Tourism website of Khongoryn Els travel company, Mongolia

 
Mongolia